Central Coast Mariners Football Club is an Australian association football club based on the Central Coast of New South Wales. The club was formed in 2004 under the backing of the technical director Alex Tobin and Ian Kiernan who would be the first chairman of the club. They played their first competitive match in the A-League Pre-Season Challenge Cup against Queensland Roar on the 23 July 2005 with their first league match being on the 26 August 2005 against Perth Glory which they would win 1-0. They would later go on to reach the first A-League Grand Final on 5 March 2006 before losing to Sydney FC by a single goal.

The club was formed in 2004 to be one of the original teams in the A-League, which replaced the National Soccer League. The team had great early successes, winning the first A-League Pre-Season Challenge Cup and coming second in the first A-League Championship. Lawrie McKinna was the club's first manager, for five seasons, in which time the team won an A-League Premiership and competed in the AFC Champions League.

Following McKinna's time in charge Graham Arnold was appointed as the club's head coach. Under Arnold, the side won another A-League Premiership and their first A-League Championship, as well as progressing past the group stage of the AFC Champions League for the first time.

The club has won the A-League Premiership twice, the A-League Championship once and the A-League Pre-Season Challenge Cup once. This list shows the team's competitive records since their inaugural 2005-06 season. Top scorers in bold also won the A-League Men Golden Boot that season.

Seasons

References

External links
Ultimate A-League
aleaguestats.com

Central Coast Mariners FC seasons
Central Coast Mariners FC
C